The 1970 Kansas State Wildcats football team represented Kansas State University in the 1970 NCAA University Division football season.  The team's head football coach was Vince Gibson.  The Wildcats played their home games in KSU Stadium.

Senior quarterback Lynn Dickey led the team to a third straight season as the top-rated passing offense in the Big Eight Conference.  Kansas State also led the conference in total defense, and posted its first win against a top-ten team, beating #8 Colorado.  The Wildcats went into the final conference game of the season against Nebraska ranked #20 and playing for the Big Eight championship.  The #4-ranked Cornhuskers throttled Kansas State 51–13 in the game.  Kansas State did not return to the national rankings again until the 1993 season.

The team finished with a winning record in conference play for the first time since  1953. After the season Gibson was named coach of the year by the Big Eight.

Schedule

Roster

References

Kansas State
Kansas State Wildcats football seasons
Kansas State Wildcats football